Seychelles first participated at the Olympic Games in 1980, and has sent athletes to compete in most Summer Olympic Games since then, missing only the 1988 Games when Seychelles did not respond to the invitation sent by the IOC. The nation has never participated in the Winter Olympic Games.

To date, no Seychellois athlete has ever won an Olympic medal.

The National Olympic Committee for Seychelles was created in 1979 and recognized by the International Olympic Committee that same year.

Medal tables

Medals by Games

See also
 List of flag bearers for Seychelles at the Olympics
 :Category:Olympic competitors for Seychelles
 Seychelles at the Paralympics

References

External links
 
 
 

 
Olympics